Fat Boys is the self-titled debut studio album by American hip hop group the Fat Boys, released on May 29, 1984, by Sutra Records. It was produced by Kurtis Blow. The album is dedicated to the memory of Rebecca Wimbley and William (Divine) Santos. It peaked at number 48 on the US Billboard 200, and number 6 on the Top R&B/Hip Hop Albums chart. The album was certified Gold by the RIAA on May 6, 1985.

The album contains two Billboard singles: "Jail House Rap" and "Can You Feel It?". The songs "Don't You Dog Me" and "Fat Boys" were performed in the movie Krush Groove during the Disco Fever scene. "Jail House Rap" and "Fat Boys" were performed on an episode of Soul Train that aired on January 5, 1985.
 
On November 23, 2012, the album was reissued in a limited edition CD and vinyl package. The album is housed in a pizza box, with the album itself being a picture disc of pizza, with a special book and bonus material (downloadable for the vinyl version). XXL revisited the Fat Boys' iconic debut album 30 years later.

Background
Buff a.k.a. The Human Beat Box (Darren Robinson), Prince Markie Dee (Mark Morales) and Kool Rock-Ski (Damon Wimbley) were hip-hop's first brand, jumping out of helicopters in Swatch commercials and demolishing buffets in movies. Their manager is a Swiss-born promoter named Charlie Stettler, the owner of his label-management company Tin Pan Apple. In 1983, he put on a hip-hop talent contest at Radio City Music Hall, and the Fat Boys-then rapping as Disco 3-were the unexpected walk-on champs. "Stick 'Em" was the song they used to win the contest. Stettler took the group to his native Switzerland. And though they arrived in Europe as the Disco 3, the group flew back to New York as the Fat Boys. Charlie Stettler hooked up the group with producer Kurtis Blow who gave them their signature sound. Kurtis Blow enlisted Run-D.M.C. drum-machine programmer Larry Smith and bassist Davy "DMX" Reeves, both of whom were behind some of the best records of the era to work on it. "Stick 'Em" was the first thing that they recorded with Kurtis Blow. Charlie Stettler also got Swatch to sponsor 1984's Fresh Festival Tour and convinced Russell Simmons to add the Fat Boys to a line-up that included Run-D.M.C., Whodini and Newcleus.

The Fat Boys released 3 singles from this album: "Jail House Rap", "Can You Feel It?" and "Fat Boys".

The group released 5 official music videos on the songs from this album: "Fat Boys", "Jail House Rap", "Can You Feel It?", "Stick 'Em" and "Don't You Dog Me".

Reception

In a contemporary interview and review, Sounds described both the album and single for "Fat Boys" as "well naff. It's this sort of pointless juvenile gimmickry which is rapidly turning the hip-hop culture into a trembling jelly of silliness with its desperate appeals to the lowest criteria."

In a retrospective review AllMusic stated that "Because of their comic image, some hip-hoppers dismissed the Fat Boys as a novelty act -- some, but not many." and noted that The Fat Boys were "among the best and most popular rappers of the mid-1980s. Along with Run-D.M.C., L.L. Cool J, and Whodini, the Fat Boys were the finest that hip-hop's "Second Generation" (as it was called) had to offer." The review declared it to be an "excellent debut album" which was "humorous, wildly entertaining, and unapologetically funky" and that the album was "a true hip-hop classic."

Robert Christgau gave the album A−, saying "...These prize porkers parody insatiability--long after the break of dawn (long after you're limp, Dick), they'll still be stuffing it. They won't ever be great rappers technically, though Prince Markie Dee has the poise and clarity to get close and the bass-kazoo hums and belchlike aspirations of the Human Beat Box show rhythmic instinct and sonic imagination. But their shambling, cheerful fat-boy dance is a party for kids of all ages. I love the hooks on "Fat Boys" and the barks on "Don't You Dog Me," and if "Jail House Rap" is no "Message" or "Hustler's Convention," neither is it a trivialization—at least as silly and serious as Lee Dorsey in the coal mine or Sam Cooke on the chain gang."

Track listing
Side A
 "Jail House Rap" (Mark Morales / Damon Wimbley / Darren Robinson / Kurtis Blow / Trevor Horn / Malcolm McLaren) – 8:30
 "Stick 'Em" (M. Morales / D. Wimbley / D. Robinson) – 4:26
 "Can You Feel It?" (M. Morales / D. Wimbley / D. Robinson / K. Blow / Charles Hale) – 6:38

Side B
 "Fat Boys" (M. Morales / D. Wimbley / D. Robinson / K. Blow) – 6:50
 "The Place to Be" (M. Morales / D. Wimbley / D. Robinson / K. Blow) – 4:26
 "Human Beat Box" (M. Morales / D. Wimbley / D. Robinson) – 2:16
 "Don't You Dog Me" (M. Morales / D. Wimbley / D. Robinson / K. Blow) – 5:50

2012 bonus tracks
 "Reality" 
 "International Love"
 "All You Can Eat"
 "Fat Boys Promo (Rap Attack)"
 "Fat Boys And Charlie Stettler Interview (Mr. Magic's Rap Attack - 4/20/84)"
 "Fat Boys Interview A (Mr. Magic's Rap Attack - 1/23/84)"
 "Fat Boys Interview B (Mr. Magic's Rap Attack - 1/23/84)"
 "Mr. Magic announcing The Disco 3 as winners at Radio City Music Hall on May 23, 1983" (hidden bonus track)

Personnel

The group
 Prince Markie Dee – Rapping
 Human Beat Box – Beatbox, Scratching, Rapping 
 Kool Rock-Ski – Rapping

Additional musicians
 Angie Blake - Vocals
 Kurtis Blow - Musician, vocals
 Don Blackman - Musician
 Danny Harris - Musician
 Francis Johnson - Vocals
 Tony McLaughlin - Musician
 David Ogrin - Musician
 Davy "DMX" Reeves - bass
 Larry Smith - drum machine
 Tashawn - Vocals
 Audrew Whleeler - Vocals
 Alyson Williams - Vocals

Technical staff
 Kurtis Blow, Art Kass, Charles Stettler – producers
 David Ogrin – engineer
 Herb Powers Jr. – mastering engineer

Charts

Weekly charts

Certifications

References

External links
 Fat Boys at Discogs
 Fat Boys at RapGenius
 Daily Operation: Fat Boys Debut Album (May 29, 1984)

1984 debut albums
The Fat Boys albums
Albums in memory of deceased persons